Chan Nyein Kyaw (born 8 December 1992) is a Burmese footballer playing as a goalkeeper for Burmese club Yadanarbon. He was signed from Rakhine United to the Yadanarbon.

References

1992 births
Living people
People from Yangon Region
Burmese footballers
Association football goalkeepers
Yadanarbon F.C. players